Benjamin Timms (born 23 July 1998) is an English professional wrestler, currently signed to WWE where he performs on the NXT brand under ring name Nathan Frazer.

Professional wrestling career

Early career (2018–2020)
Timms made his wrestling debut in 2018 under the ring name Benjamin Carter performing in various independent promotions and major promotions such as Impact Wrestling and All Elite Wrestling.

WWE (2020–present)

NXT UK (2020–2022) 
On December 17, 2020, WWE announced that they signed Timms. He was then assigned to the NXT UK where, on the episode 7 January 2021 episode, he made his debut under the ring name Ben Carter, facing Jordan Devlin for the NXT Cruiserweight Championship but lost. After defeating Josh Morell and Sam Gradwell, Carter was repackaged as Nathan Frazer on 11 March.

On the 3 June episode of NXT UK Frazer and Jack Starz teamed up to face Pretty Deadly (Lewis Howley and Sam Stoker) for the NXT UK Tag Team Championship but were defeated. Later, Frazer competed to become the No. 1 contender for the NXT UK Heritage Cup but he lost to Teoman in the first round. Subsequently, Frazer also competed to become the No. 1 contender for the NXT United Kingdom Championship on 23 September, competed against A-Kid and Rampage Brown where the former won. On 3 March 2022, Frazer fought his last match at NXT UK in a NXT United Kingdom Championship match losing to Ilja Dragunov.

NXT (2022–present) 
On April 12, It was announced that Frazer would make his NXT debut. At Spring Breakin' on May 3, he debuted by defeating Grayson Waller due to the interference of Andre Chase. On the August 2 episode of NXT 2.0, Frazer responded to Carmelo Hayes' open challenge for the NXT North American Championship but lost when Giovanni Vinci interfered.

Championships and accomplishments 
Resolute Wrestling
 Resolute P4P Championship (1 time)
 Resolute Undisputed Championship (2 times)
SCW Pro Wrestling
 SCW Pro Iowa Wrestling Championship (1 time)

References

External links 
 
 
 

1998 births
Living people
English male professional wrestlers
Jersey sportspeople
21st-century professional wrestlers